This is a list of American television-related events in 1973.

Events

Television programs

Programs
60 Minutes (1968–)
All in the Family (1971–79)
All My Children (1970–2011)
American Bandstand (1952–89)
Another World (1964–99)
As the World Turns (1956–2010)
Bonanza (1959–73)
Bozo the Clown (1949–)
Candid Camera (1948–)
Captain Kangaroo (1955–84)
Columbo (1971–78)
Concentration (1958–78)
Days of Our Lives (1965–)
Emergency! (1972–77)
Face the Nation (1954–)
Fat Albert and the Cosby Kids (1972–84)
General Hospital (1963–)
Gunsmoke (1955–75)
Hallmark Hall of Fame (1951–)
Hawaii Five-O (1968–80)
Hee Haw (1969–93)
Here's Lucy (1968–74)
I've Got a Secret (1972–73)
Ironside (1967–75)
It's Academic (1961–)
Jeopardy! (1964–75, 1984–)
Kimba the White Lion (1966–67), re-runs
Kung Fu (1972–75)
Love of Life (1951–80)
Love, American Style (1969–74)
Mannix (1967–75)
Marcus Welby, M.D. (1969–76)
Mary Tyler Moore (1970–77)
M*A*S*H (1972–83)
Masterpiece Theatre (1971–)
Maude (1972–78)
McCloud (1970–77)
McMillan & Wife (1971–77)
Meet the Press (1947–)
Monday Night Football (1970–)
One Life to Live (1968–2012)
Police Story (1973–78)
Rainbow (1972–92)
Room 222 (1969–74)
Sanford and Son (1972–77)
Search for Tomorrow (1951–86)
Sesame Street (1969–)
Soul Train (1971–2006) 
The Bob Newhart Show (1972–78)
The Brady Bunch (1969–74)
The Carol Burnett Show (1967–78)
The Dean Martin Show (1965–19)
The Doctors (1963–82)
The Edge of Night (1956–84)
The Flip Wilson Show (1970–74)
The Guiding Light (1952–2009)
The Lawrence Welk Show (1955–82)
The Mike Douglas Show (1961–81)
The New Dick Van Dyke Show (1971–74)
The Newlywed Game (1966–74)
The Odd Couple (1970–75)
The Partridge Family (1970–74)
The Price Is Right (1972–)
The Secret Storm (1954–74)
The Sonny & Cher Comedy Hour (1971–74)
The Today Show (1952–)
The Tonight Show Starring Johnny Carson (1962–92)
The Waltons (1972–81)
The Wonderful World of Disney (1969–79)
To Tell the Truth (1956–68; 1969–78)
Truth or Consequences (1950–88)
What's My Line (1950–75)

Debuting this year

Ending this year

Networks and services

Network launches

Television stations

Sign-ons

Network affiliation changes

Station closures

Births

Deaths

See also
1973 in television 
1973 in film  
List of American films of 1973
1972-73 United States network television schedule 
1973-74 United States network television schedule

References

External links 
List of 1973 American television series at IMDb